Root Into Europe is an ITV comedy-drama based on the character from William Donaldson's book The Henry Root Letters. Five episodes Written by Donaldson and Mark Chapman and produced by Aspect Film & TV  for Central Independent Television, were first broadcast in May and June 1992. The series starred George Cole as Henry Root, and Pat Heywood as his wife, Muriel.

Henry Root, a fish dealer who disapproves of the impending European Union, declares himself England's 'European regulator' in a letter to the British Prime Minister, then John Major. He takes his wife Muriel (Pat Heywood) on a tour of Europe to represent English values to mainland Europe. His adventures are captured on a camcorder by his wife to be sent to the BBC upon his return for a future documentary, which one expects will never be made. The episodes bring him to France, Spain, Italy, Germany, Belgium and The Netherlands.

External links
Comedy Guide – Root Into Europe at bbc.co.uk
 
BFI database

ITV television dramas
1992 British television series debuts
1992 British television series endings
1990s British drama television series
1990s British television miniseries
Europe in fiction
Television episodes set in Paris
Television shows set in Madrid
Television episodes set in Rome
Television episodes set in Berlin
Television shows set in Brussels
Television shows set in Amsterdam
Television shows set in Europe
Television episodes set in France
Television episodes set in Belgium
Television episodes set in Italy
Television episodes set in Germany
Television episodes set in Spain
Television episodes set in the Netherlands
Television series by Tiger Aspect Productions
Television shows produced by Central Independent Television
Television series by ITV Studios